The annually held Varuna naval exercise is an integral part of France–India strategic relationship in the 21st century and consists of naval cooperation drills between the French Navy and the Indian Navy. The joint-exercises are held either in the Indian Ocean or Mediterranean Sea with the aim of improving Indo-French coordination on capabilities like cross-deck operations, replenishment-at-sea, minesweeping, anti-submarine warfare and information sharing. It was first started in 1983, though given its present name in 2001. France is Littoral State of the Indian Ocean through the French Overseas region of Réunion, Mayotte and Scattered Islands in the Indian Ocean.

Varuna 2015 included a French battle-group led by French aircraft carrier Charles de Gaulle (R91) and carrying aero-naval version of Rafale aircraft will operate alongside the Western Naval Command. The latest edition of Varuna exercise, that is the 17th edition, was held between 1 and 10 May 2019 along the Goa coast.

References

External links

 Varuna 2006
 Varuna 06
 Varuna 09 Video

Indian naval exercises
French Navy
France–India relations